Yellowstone Airport  is a state-owned public-use airport located adjacent to U.S. 191/U.S. 287 one nautical mile (2 km) north of the central business district of West Yellowstone, a town in Gallatin County, Montana, United States. Although only open from June through September, commercial passenger service is available during those months. Scheduled airline service is subsidized by the federal Essential Air Service (EAS) program.

As per Federal Aviation Administration records, the airport had 4,186 passenger boardings (enplanements) in calendar year 2008, 4,331 enplanements in 2009, and 4,451 in 2010. It is included in the National Plan of Integrated Airport Systems for 2011–2015, which categorized it as a non-primary commercial service airport (between 2,500 and 10,000 enplanements per year).

The town of West Yellowstone is located near the west entrance to Yellowstone National Park. In the past the Official Airline Guide (OAG) referred to the Yellowstone Airport in its scheduled airline flight listings as West Yellowstone (WYS).

Historical airline service

Two airlines operated mainline jet aircraft into the airport, although all service was seasonal in nature and was not operated during the winter months. In the 1960s and 1970s, Western Airlines served the airport on a seasonal basis with Lockheed L-188 Electra propjets with the airline then replacing this turboprop service with Boeing 737-200 jet flights. During the summer of 1973, Western was operating four 737 flights a day into the airport with nonstop jet service to Butte, MT; Great Falls; MT, Idaho Falls, ID; and Salt Lake City; as well as flying direct, no change of plane jet service to Las Vegas; Ontario, CA; San Diego; and San Francisco. Western was subsequently acquired by Delta Air Lines which then turned the former Western service at the airport over to regional airline affiliate Delta Connection operated by SkyWest Airlines. The original Frontier Airlines (1950-1986) served the airport as well with direct Boeing 737-200 jetliner service to Denver which was also operated on a seasonal basis. Prior to operating jet flights, Frontier served the airport with Convair 580 turboprop aircraft.

Facilities and aircraft

Yellowstone Airport covers an area of 735 acres (297 ha) at an elevation of 6,649 feet (2,027 m) above mean sea level. It has one runway designated 01/19 with an asphalt surface measuring 8,400 by 150 feet (2,560 x 46 m).

Choice Aviation, the airport's fixed-base operators (FBOs), offer fuel, flight instruction, aircraft/hangar rental, and other services.

One of the largest aircraft ever to use the airport was a USAF KC-135 Stratotanker operated by the Air National Guard with this aerial refueling tanker jet performing several "touch and go" landings and takeoffs on June 8, 2022.

West Yellowstone Interagency Fire Center

The federal West Yellowstone Interagency Fire Center oversees aerial fire fighting operations and is located two miles north of the Yellowstone National Park Gateway community of West Yellowstone, MT, 90 miles south of Bozeman, MT and 100 miles northeast of Idaho Falls, Idaho. The base was established in 1951 at the old airport just west of town and then moved to its present location in 1965.  It is jointly operated by the U.S. Forest Service (USFS) and the National Park Service (NPS).  USFS is an agency of the U.S. Department of Agriculture while NPS is an agency of the U.S. Department of the Interior.

During the summer the base is home to 21 smokejumpers, pilots for the jump plane and fire fighting air tanker, an office manager, and an air tanker base manager. The base also supports visiting jumpers, tankers and other aerial firefighting resources during times of high fire activity. The "jump ship" aircraft is a Dornier 228 twin turboprop aircraft configured for smokejumper operations while the air tanker aircraft varies between converted British Aerospace BAe 146 and McDonnell Douglas MD-87 jet aircraft (both formerly operated in passenger airline service) as well as Lockheed C-130 and Canadair CL-415 turboprop aircraft. These Next-Gen firefighting aircraft can carry up to 3,000 gallons of firefighting retardant and support the greater Yellowstone area.
The West Yellowstone jumpers and the air tanker are considered national resources. While attached to the Gallatin National Forest with a primary response area of the Gallatin, Shoshone, Beaverhead/Deerlodge, Targhee, Bridger/Teton, and Custer National Forests as well as Yellowstone National Park and Teton National Park, they can be dispatched anywhere in the country to respond to wildfires on federal lands.

Airlines and destinations

The airport is served on a seasonal basis by SkyWest Airlines operating as Delta Connection, with Canadair CRJ-200 regional jet aircraft flying nonstop to and from the Delta hub located at Salt Lake City Airport (SLC). After serving the airport for many years with Embraer EMB-120 Brasilia turboprops, SkyWest upgraded its seasonal Delta Connection service into West Yellowstone with Canadair regional jets on June 1, 2015 thus marking the first time WYS has had jet service in nearly 30 years, according to the airline. SkyWest also currently operates seasonal service flying as United Express on behalf of United Airlines with nonstop flights between Denver (DEN) and the airport operated with Canadair CRJ-200 regional jets.

Statistics

Top destinations

References

Other sources

 Essential Air Service documents (Docket DOT-OST-2003-14626) from the U.S. Department of Transportation:
 Order 2006-3-29: selecting SkyWest Airlines d/b/a Delta Connection to provide essential air service (EAS) with 30-passenger Embraer Brasília aircraft at West Yellowstone, Montana, for the 2006 and 2007 summer seasons. The subsidy rate will be set at $247,122 per season.
 Order 2008-1-4: selecting SkyWest Airlines d/b/a Delta Connection to provide essential air service (EAS) with 30-passenger Embraer Brasília aircraft at West Yellowstone, Montana, for the 2008 and 2009 summer seasons. The subsidy rate will be set at $431,996 per season.
 Order 2010-3-30: selecting SkyWest Airlines d/b/a Delta Connection to continue to provide essential air service (EAS) at West Yellowstone, Montana, at an annual subsidy rate of $427,757, for the next two summer seasons from June 1 through September 30, 2010 and 2011.
 Order 2012-4-9: selecting SkyWest Airlines to continue to provide Essential Air Service (EAS) at West Yellowstone, Montana, at an annual subsidy rate of $389,412, for the next summer season from June 1 through September 30, 2012.

External links
 Yellowstone Airport, official site
 Yellowstone Aviation, the fixed-base operator
 Aerial image as of June 1994 from USGS The National Map
 

Airports in Montana
Buildings and structures in Gallatin County, Montana
Essential Air Service
Transportation in Gallatin County, Montana
West Yellowstone, Montana